Zamzam is a settlement of Sirte in Libya.

References 

Sahara
Baladiyat of Libya